The Asia-Pacific Amateur Championship is an annual amateur golf tournament. It is played at various locations throughout Asia-Pacific. It is organized by the Asia-Pacific Golf Confederation (APGC) and was first played in 2009. It was organized in conjunction with the Masters Tournament and The R&A, organizers of The Open Championship. The winner receives an invitation to the Masters and The Open Championship (beginning in 2018). The winner and runner-up had previously gained entry to International Final Qualifying for the Open from 2009 to 2017. In 2011, the winner also receives an invitation to the Asian Tour's season ending Thailand Golf Championship. It is also considered an "elite" event by the World Amateur Golf Ranking in that any player that makes the cut is eligible to be ranked. Only the U.S. Amateur, British Amateur, and European Amateur have this distinction.

The winner in 2012, Guan Tianlang went on to play in the 2013 Masters Tournament and so became the youngest player in Masters history at 14.

Winners

* Shortened to 54 holes due to poor weather conditions.

References

External links

Asia-Pacific Golf Confederation

Amateur golf tournaments
Golf tournaments in Asia
Recurring sporting events established in 2009